Macbeth is a black and white 1922 film adaptation of the William Shakespeare play Macbeth. It was the last silent film version of that play produced, and the eighth film adaptation of the play. It was directed by H. B. Parkinson and produced by Frank Miller.

Cast
Russell Thorndike as Macbeth
Sybil Thorndike as Lady Macbeth

References

1922 films
British silent short films
Films based on Macbeth
Films directed by H. B. Parkinson
British black-and-white films